The American wall gecko (Tarentola americana) is a species of lizard in the family Phyllodactylidae. The species is endemic to Cuba and the Bahamas. There are two recognized subspecies.

Subspecies
Including the nominotypical subspecies, two subspecies are recognized as being valid.
Tarentola americana americana 
Tarentola american warreni 

Nota bene: A trinomial authority in parentheses indicates that the subspecies was originally described in a genus other than Tarentola.

Etymology
The subspecific name, warreni, is in honor of C. Rhea Warren who collected the holotype.

Geographic range
T. a. americana is found on the island of Cuba and associated islets. T. a. warreni is found on some of the northern islands of the Bahamas.

Reproduction
T. americana is oviparous.

References

Further reading
Boulenger GA (1885). Catalogue of the Lizards in the British Museum (Natural History). Second Edition. Volume I. Geckonidæ ... London: Trustees of the British Museum (Natural History). (Taylor and Francis, printers). xii + 436 pp. + Plates I–XXXII. (Tarentola americana and T. cubana, p. 195).
Gray JE (1831). "A Synopsis of the Species of the Class Reptilia". Supplement, 110 pp. In: Griffith E (1831). The Animal Kingdom Arranged in Conformity with its Organization, by the Baron Cuvier, Member of the Institute of France, &c. &c. &c. with Additional Descriptions of All the Species hitherto Named, and of Many not before Noticed, Volume the Ninth. London: Whitaker, Treacher, and Co. 480 pp. (Platydactylus americanus, new species, p. 48).
Schwartz A (1968). "Geographic variation in the new world gekkonid lizard Tarentola americana Gray". Proceedings of the Biological Society of  Washington 81: 123–142. (Tarentola americana warreni, new subspecies, pp. 134–139, Figure 2).
Schwartz A, Henderson RW (1991). Amphibians and Reptiles of the West Indies: Descriptions, Distributions, and Natural History. Gainesville: University of Florida Press. 720 pp. . (Tarentola americana, p. 549).
Schwartz A, Thomas R (1975). A Check-list of West Indian Amphibians and Reptiles. Carnegie Museum of Natural History Special Publication No. 1. Pittsburgh, Pennsylvania: Carnegie Museum of Natural History. 216 pp. (Tarentola americana, pp. 165).
Stejneger L (1917). "Cuban amphibians and reptiles collected for the United States National Museum from 1899 to 1902". Proceedings of the United States National Museum 53: 259–291. (Tarentola cubana, p. 266, Figures 27–29).

Tarentola
Reptiles described in 1831
Taxa named by John Edward Gray